These are the official results of the 2006 Asian Indoor Athletics Championships which took place on 10–12 February 2008 in Pattaya, Thailand.

Men's results

60 meters

Heats – 10 February

Semifinals – 10 February

Final – 10 February

400 meters

Heats – 10 February

Final – 11 February

800 meters

Heats – 10 February

Final – 11 February

1500 meters

Heats – 11 February

Final – 12 February

3000 meters
11 February

60 meters hurdles
11 February

4 x 400 meters relay
12 February

High jump
10 February

Pole vault
11 February

Long jump
10 February

Triple jump
12 February

Shot put
12 February

Heptathlon
11–12 February

Women's results

60 meters

Heats – 10 February

Final – 10 February

400 meters
11 February

800 meters

Heats – 10 February

Final – 10 February

1500 meters
12 February

3000 meters
11 February

60 meters hurdles
11 February

4 x 400 meters relay
12 February

High jump
12 February

Pole vault
10 February

Long jump
11 February

Triple jump
10 February

Shot put
12 February

Pentathlon
10 February

References
Results

Asian Indoor Championships
Events at the Asian Indoor Athletics Championships